Secundino Aifuch Osorio (born 21 July 1952) is a Paraguayan former professional footballer who played as a centre-back.

Club career
He spent most of his career in the Paraguayan Primera División, playing with Sol de América and Cerro Porteño, winning a title with the latter in 1977 and playing five matches at the 1978 Copa Libertadores before moving to Spanish side Espanyol ahead of the 1978–79 La Liga season. In four seasons in Spain, he made 67 league appearances, scoring six times. 

In his fourth match with the club, on 29 April 1979, he scored against Barcelona at Camp Nou, putting one past Pedro Artola albeit during a 2–1 defeat. Three weeks later, he scored Espanyol's 2,000th top-flight goal in a victory over Burgos. The transfer of young star defender Canito to Barcelona meant Aifuch became a regular starter during his second season in 1979–80. He netted his only brace with the team in a win over Las Palmas in May 1981. However, Canito's return to Espanyol in 1981–82 relegated him back to the bench. Even further, he suffered a grave injury during a match against Las Palmas on 10 November 1981, tearing his MCL in his left knee. This was Aifuch's last match in La Liga.

He returned to Cerro Porteño for a season before finishing his career with Sportivo San Lorenzo and Sportivo Iteño, with a short stint with Italian club AC Santa Maria in 1984–1985.

In 2017, he was selected by a commission of Cerro Porteño fans as one of the 35 "club idols" that received a tribute at the re-inauguration of their home ground Estadio General Pablo Rojas.

International career
Aifuch was part of the national squad that won the 1971 South American U-20 Championship held in Paraguay by going undefeated. He scored in the semi-final victory over Peru.

He earned 20 caps with the senior national team from 1975 to 1981. He represented his country during 1978 and 1982 FIFA World Cup qualifiers. He also played in the 1976 Taça do Atlântico.

International goals
Scores and results list Paraguay's goal tally first.

Honours

Club
Cerro Porteño
 Paraguayan Primera División: 1977

Personal life
His uncle, Juvencio Osorio, won three straight titles with Cerro Porteño (1972–1974) before spending four years at Espanyol and eventually retiring with Cerro Porteño. They were teammates for one season in Spain in 1978–79.

Notes

References

External links
 
 
 

Living people
1952 births
Paraguayan footballers
Paraguayan expatriate footballers
Paraguay international footballers
Association football central defenders
Club Sol de América footballers
Cerro Porteño players
RCD Espanyol footballers
Sportivo Iteño footballers
Paraguayan Primera División players
Paraguayan División Intermedia players
La Liga players
Paraguayan expatriate sportspeople in Spain
Paraguayan expatriate sportspeople in Italy
Expatriate footballers in Spain
Expatriate footballers in Italy
Sportspeople from Asunción
Paraguay under-20 international footballers